Arrows of Rain is a novel by Nigerian author Okey Ndibe. It is his debut novel.

References

2000 Nigerian novels
Novels by Okey Ndibe